The Western is a genre of fiction set in the American frontier and commonly associated with folk tales of the Western United States, particularly the Southwestern United States, as well as Northern Mexico and Western Canada. It is commonly referred to as the "Old West" or the "Wild West" and depicted in Western media as a hostile, sparsely populated frontier in a state of near-total lawlessness patrolled by outlaws, sheriffs, and numerous other stock "gunslinger" characters. Western narratives often concern the gradual attempts to tame the crime-ridden American West using wider themes of justice, freedom, rugged individualism, Manifest Destiny, and the national history and identity of the United States.

History

The first films that belong to the Western genre are a series of short single reel silents made in 1894 by Edison Studios at their Black Maria studio in West Orange, New Jersey. These featured veterans of Buffalo Bill's Wild West show exhibiting skills acquired by living in the Old West – they included Annie Oakley (shooting) and members of the Sioux (dancing).

The earliest known Western narrative film is the British short Kidnapping by Indians, made by Mitchell and Kenyon in Blackburn, England, in 1899. The Great Train Robbery (1903, based on the earlier British film A Daring Daylight Burglary), Edwin S. Porter's film starring Broncho Billy Anderson, is often erroneously cited as the first Western, though George N. Fenin and William K. Everson point out (as mentioned above) that the "Edison company had played with Western material for several years prior to The Great Train Robbery". Nonetheless, they concur that Porter's film "set the pattern—of crime, pursuit, and retribution—for the Western film as a genre". The film's popularity opened the door for Anderson to become the screen's first Western star; he made several hundred Western film shorts. So popular was the genre that he soon faced competition from Tom Mix and William S. Hart.

"Golden Age"
The period from 1940 to 1960 has been called the "Golden Age of the Western". It is epitomized by the work of several prominent directors including:

 Robert Aldrich – Apache (1954), Vera Cruz (1954)
 Budd Boetticher – several films with Randolph Scott including The Tall T (1957) and Comanche Station (1960) 
 Delmer Daves – Broken Arrow (1950), The Last Wagon (1956), 3:10 to Yuma (1957)
 Walt Disney – Texas John Slaughter (1958), The Nine Lives of Elfego Baca (1958)
 Allan Dwan – Silver Lode (1954), Cattle Queen of Montana (1954)
 John Ford  – Stagecoach (1939), My Darling Clementine (1946), The Searchers (1956), The Man Who Shot Liberty Valance (1962)
 Samuel Fuller – Run of the Arrow (1957), Forty Guns (1957)
 George Roy Hill – Butch Cassidy and the Sundance Kid (1969)
 Howard Hawks – Red River (1948), Rio Bravo (1959), El Dorado (1966)
 Henry King – The Gunfighter (1950), The Bravados (1958)
 Sergio Leone – For a Few Dollars More (1965), The Good, the Bad and the Ugly (1966), Once Upon a Time in the West (1968)
 Anthony Mann – Winchester '73 (1950), The Man from Laramie (1955), The Tin Star (1957)
 Sam Peckinpah – Ride the High Country (1962), The Wild Bunch (1969)
 Nicholas Ray – Johnny Guitar (1954)
 George Stevens – Annie Oakley (1935), Shane (1953)
 John Sturges – Gunfight at the O.K. Corral (1957), The Magnificent Seven (1960)
 Jacques Tourneur – Canyon Passage (1946), Wichita (1955) 
 King Vidor – Duel in the Sun (1946), Man Without a Star (1955)  
 William A. Wellman – The Ox-Bow Incident (1943), Yellow Sky (1948)
 Fred Zinnemann – High Noon (1952)

Revivals
There have been numerous instances of worldwide pop culture resurgences for the Western genre. During the 1960s and 1970s, Spaghetti Westerns from Italy became popular worldwide, this was due to the success of Sergio Leone's storytelling method.

At the turn of the 21st century, Westerns have once again seen an ongoing revival in popularity. Largely influenced by the recapturing of Americana mythology, appreciation for the vaquero folklore within Mexican culture and the US Southwest, interest in the Western lifestyle's music and clothing, Japanese popular culture including anime and manga, along with popular videos games series like Red Dead.

Stories and characters

Stories commonly center on the life of a nomadic, male, white American drifter, cowboy or gunfighter who rides a horse and is armed with a revolver and/or a rifle. The male characters typically wear broad-brimmed and high-crowned Stetson hats, neckerchief bandannas, vests, and cowboy boots with spurs. While many wear conventional shirts and trousers, alternatives include buckskins and dusters).

Women are generally cast in secondary roles as romantic interest for the male lead; or in supporting roles as saloon girls, prostitutes or as the wives of pioneers and settlers (the wife character often provides a measure of comic relief). Other recurring characters include Native Americans of various tribes, African Americans, Mexicans, lawmen, bounty hunters, outlaws, bartenders, traders, gamblers, soldiers (especially mounted cavalry), pioneers and settlers (farmers, ranchers, and townsfolk).

The ambience is usually punctuated with a Western music score, including American folk music and Spanish/Mexican folk music such as country, Native American music, New Mexico music, and rancheras.

Locations
Westerns often stress the harshness of the wilderness and frequently set the action in an arid, desolate landscape of deserts and mountains. Often, the vast landscape plays an important role, presenting a "mythic vision of the plains and deserts of the American West". Specific settings include ranches, small frontier towns, saloons, railways, wilderness, and isolated military forts of the Wild West. Many Westerns use a stock plot of depicting a crime, then showing the pursuit of the wrongdoer, ending in revenge and retribution, which is often dispensed through a shootout or quick-draw duel.

Themes

The Western genre sometimes portrays the conquest of the wilderness and the subordination of nature in the name of civilization or the confiscation of the territorial rights of the original, Native American, inhabitants of the frontier. The Western depicts a society organized around codes of honor and personal, direct or private justice–"frontier justice"–dispensed by gunfights. These honor codes are often played out through depictions of feuds or individuals seeking personal revenge or retribution against someone who has wronged them (e.g., True Grit has revenge and retribution as its main themes). This Western depiction of personal justice contrasts sharply with justice systems organized around rationalistic, abstract law that exist in cities, in which social order is maintained predominantly through relatively impersonal institutions such as courtrooms. The popular perception of the Western is a story that centers on the life of a seminomadic wanderer, usually a cowboy or a gunfighter.  A showdown or duel at high noon featuring two or more gunfighters is a stereotypical scene in the popular conception of Westerns.

In some ways, such protagonists may be considered the literary descendants of the knights-errant, who stood at the center of earlier extensive genres such as the Arthurian romances. Like the cowboy or gunfighter of the Western, the knight-errant of the earlier European tales and poetry was wandering from place to place on his horse, fighting villains of various kinds, and bound to no fixed social structures, but only to his own innate code of honor. Like knights-errant, the heroes of Westerns frequently rescue damsels in distress. Similarly, the wandering protagonists of Westerns share many characteristics with the ronin in modern Japanese culture.

The Western typically takes these elements and uses them to tell simple morality tales, although some notable examples (e.g. the later Westerns of John Ford or Clint Eastwood's Unforgiven, about an old hired killer) are more morally ambiguous. Westerns often stress the harshness and isolation of the wilderness, and frequently set the action in an arid, desolate landscape. Western films generally have specific settings, such as isolated ranches, Native American villages, or small frontier towns with a saloon. Oftentimes, these settings appear deserted and without much structure. Apart from the wilderness, the saloon usually emphasizes that this is the Wild West; it is the place to go for music (raucous piano playing), women (often prostitutes), gambling (draw poker or five-card stud), drinking (beer, whiskey, or tequila if set in Mexico), brawling, and shooting. In some Westerns, where civilization has arrived, the town has a church, a general store, a bank, and a school; in others, where frontier rules still hold sway, it is, as Sergio Leone said, "where life has no value".

Plots
Author and screenwriter Frank Gruber identified seven basic plots for Westerns:
 Union Pacific story: The plot concerns construction of a railroad, a telegraph line, or some other type of modern technology on the wild frontier. Wagon-train stories fall into this category.
 Ranch story: Ranchers protecting their family ranch from rustlers or large landowners attempting to force out the proper owners.
 Empire story: The plot involves building a ranch empire or an oil empire from scratch, a classic rags-to-riches plot, often involving conflict over resources such as water or minerals
 Revenge story: The plot often involves an elaborate chase and pursuit by a wronged individual, but it may also include elements of the classic mystery story.
 Cavalry and Indian story: The plot revolves around "taming" the wilderness for White settlers and/or fighting Native Americans
 Outlaw story: The outlaw gangs dominate the action.
 Marshal story: The lawman and his challenges drive the plot

Gruber said that good writers used dialogue and plot development to develop these basic plots into believable stories.

Film

Characteristics

The American Film Institute defines Western films as those "set in the American West that [embody] the spirit, the struggle, and the demise of the new frontier".  The term "Western", used to describe a narrative film genre, appears to have originated with a July 1912 article in Motion Picture World magazine. Most of the characteristics of Western films were part of 19th-century popular Western fiction, and were firmly in place before film became a popular art form.  Western films commonly feature protagonists such as cowboys, gunslingers, and bounty hunters, who are often depicted as seminomadic wanderers who wear Stetson hats, bandannas, spurs, and buckskins, use revolvers or rifles as everyday tools of survival and as a means to settle disputes using "frontier justice". Protagonists ride between dusty towns and cattle ranches on their trusty steeds.

Western films were enormously popular in the silent-film era (1894–1927). With the advent of sound in 1927–28, the major Hollywood studios rapidly abandoned Westerns, leaving the genre to smaller studios and producers. These smaller organizations churned out countless low-budget features and serials in the 1930s. By the late 1930s, the Western film was widely regarded as a "pulp" genre in Hollywood, but its popularity was dramatically revived in 1939 by major studio productions such as Dodge City starring Errol Flynn, Jesse James with Tyrone Power, Union Pacific with Joel McCrea, Destry Rides Again featuring James Stewart and Marlene Dietrich, and especially John Ford's landmark Western adventure Stagecoach  starring John Wayne, which became one of the biggest hits of the year. Released through United Artists, Stagecoach made John Wayne a mainstream screen star in the wake of a decade of headlining B Westerns. Wayne had been introduced to the screen 10 years earlier as the leading man in director Raoul Walsh's spectacular widescreen The Big Trail, which failed at the box office in spite of being shot on location across the American West, including the Grand Canyon, Yosemite, and the giant redwoods, due in part to exhibitors' inability to switch over to widescreen during the Great Depression. After the Westerns' renewed commercial successes in the late 1930s, their popularity  continued to rise until its peak in the 1950s, when the number of Western films produced outnumbered all other genres combined.

Screenwriter and scholar Eric R. Williams identifies western films as one of eleven super-genres in his screenwriters' taxonomy, claiming that all feature length narrative films can be classified by these super-genres. The other ten super-genres are action, crime, fantasy, horror, romance, science fiction, slice of life, sports, thriller, and war.  Western films often depict conflicts with Native Americans. While early Eurocentric Westerns frequently portray the "Injuns" as dishonorable villains, the later and more culturally neutral Westerns gave Native Americans a more sympathetic treatment.  Other recurring themes of Westerns include treks (e.g. The Big Trail) or perilous journeys (e.g. Stagecoach) or groups of bandits terrorizing small towns such as in The Magnificent Seven.

Early Westerns were mostly filmed in the studio, as in other early Hollywood films, but when location shooting became more common from the 1930s, producers of Westerns used desolate corners of Arizona, California, Colorado, Kansas, Montana, Nevada, New Mexico, Oklahoma, Texas, Utah, or Wyoming. These settings gave filmmakers the ability to depict vast plains, looming mountains, and epic canyons. Productions were also filmed on location at movie ranches.

Often, the vast landscape becomes more than a vivid backdrop; it becomes a character in the film. After the early 1950s, various widescreen formats such as Cinemascope (1953) and VistaVision used the expanded width of the screen to display spectacular western landscapes. John Ford's use of Monument Valley as an expressive landscape in his films from Stagecoach to Cheyenne Autumn (1965), "present us with a mythic vision of the plains and deserts of the American West, embodied most memorably in Monument Valley, with its buttes and mesas that tower above the men on horseback, whether they be settlers, soldiers, or Native Americans".

Television

When television became popular in the late 1940s and 1950s, Television Westerns quickly became an audience favorite. Beginning with rebroadcasts of existing films, a number of movie cowboys had their own TV shows. As demand for the Western increased, new stories and stars were introduced. A number of long-running TV Westerns became classics in their own right, such as: The Lone Ranger (1949–1957), Death Valley Days (1952–1970), The Life and Legend of Wyatt Earp (1955–1961), Cheyenne (1955–1962), Gunsmoke (1955–1975), Maverick (1957–1962), Have Gun – Will Travel (1957–1963), Wagon Train (1957–1965), The Rifleman (1958–1963), Rawhide (1959–1966), Bonanza (1959–1973),  The Virginian (1962–1971), and The Big Valley (1965–1969). The Life and Legend of Wyatt Earp was the first Western television series written for adults, premiering four days before Gunsmoke on September 6, 1955.

The peak year for television Westerns was 1959, with 26 such shows airing during primetime. At least six of them were connected in some extent to Wyatt Earp: The Life and Legend of Wyatt Earp, Bat Masterson, Tombstone Territory, Broken Arrow, Johnny Ringo, and Gunsmoke. Increasing costs of American television production weeded out most action half-hour series in the early 1960s, and their replacement by hour-long television shows, increasingly in color. Traditional Westerns died out in the late 1960s as a result of network changes in demographic targeting along with pressure from parental television groups. Future entries in the genre would incorporate elements from other genera, such as crime drama and mystery whodunit elements. Western shows from the 1970s included Hec Ramsey, Kung Fu, Little House on the Prairie, McCloud, The Life and Times of Grizzly Adams, and the short-lived but highly acclaimed How the West Was Won that originated from a miniseries with the same name. In the 1990s and 2000s, hour-long Westerns and slickly packaged made-for-TV movie Westerns were introduced, such as Lonesome Dove (1989) and Dr. Quinn, Medicine Woman. Also, new elements were once again added to the Western formula, such as science-fiction Western Firefly, created by Joss Whedon in 2002. Deadwood was a critically acclaimed Western series that aired on HBO from 2004 through 2006. Hell on Wheels, a fictionalized story of the construction of the first transcontinental railroad, aired on AMC for five seasons between 2011 and 2016. Longmire is a Western series that centered on Walt Longmire, a sheriff in fictional Absaroka County, Wyoming. Originally aired on the A&E network from 2012 to 2014, it was picked up by Netflix in 2015 until the show's conclusion in 2017.

AMC and Vince Gilligan’s critically-acclaimed Breaking Bad is a much more modern take on the western genre. Set in New Mexico from 2008 through 2013, it follows Walter White (Bryan Cranston), a chemistry teacher diagnosed with Stage III Lung Cancer who cooks and sells crystal meth to provide money for his family after he dies, while slowly growing further and further into the illicit drug market, eventually turning into a ruthless drug dealer and killer. While the show has scenes in a populated suburban neighborhood and nearby Albuquerque, much of the show takes place in the desert, where Walter often takes his RV car out into the open desert to cook his meth, and most action sequences occur in the desert, similar to old-fashioned western movies. The clash between the Wild West and modern technology like cars and cellphones, while also focusing primarily on being a Crime drama makes the show a unique spin on both genres. Walter’s reliance on the desert environment makes the western-feel a pivotal role in the show, and would continue to be used in the spinoff series Better Call Saul.

Literature

Western fiction is a genre of literature set in the American Old West, most commonly between 1860 and 1900. The first critically recognized Western was The Virginian (1902) by Owen Wister. Other well-known writers of Western fiction include Zane Grey, from the early 1900s, Ernest Haycox, Luke Short, and Louis L'Amour, from the mid 20th century. Many writers better known in other genres, such as Leigh Brackett, Elmore Leonard, and Larry McMurtry, have also written Western novels. The genre's popularity peaked in the 1960s, due in part to the shuttering of many pulp magazines, the popularity of televised Westerns, and the rise of the spy novel. Readership began to drop off in the mid- to late 1970s and reached a new low in the 2000s. Most bookstores, outside of a few Western states, now only carry a small number of Western novels and short-story collections.

Literary forms that share similar themes include stories of the American frontier, the gaucho literature of Argentina, and tales of the settlement of the Australian Outback.

Visual arts

A number of visual artists focused their work on representations of the American Old West. American West-oriented art is sometimes referred to as "Western Art" by Americans. This relatively new category of art includes paintings, sculptures, and sometimes Native American crafts. Initially, subjects included exploration of the Western states and cowboy themes. Frederic Remington and Charles M. Russell are two artists who captured the "Wild West" in paintings and sculpture. After the death of Remington Richard Lorenz became the preeminent artist painting in the western genre.

Some art museums, such as the Buffalo Bill Center of the West in Wyoming and the Autry National Center in Los Angeles, feature American Western Art.

Other media
The popularity of Westerns extends beyond films, literature, television, and visual art to include numerous other media.

Anime and manga
With anime and manga, the genre tends towards the science-fiction Western – e.g., Cowboy Bebop (1998 anime), Trigun (1995–2007 manga), and Outlaw Star (1996–1999 manga). Although contemporary Westerns also appear, such as Koya no Shonen Isamu, a 1971 shonen manga about a boy with a Japanese father and a Native American mother, or El Cazador de la Bruja, a 2007 anime television series set in modern-day Mexico. Part 7 of the manga series JoJo's Bizarre Adventure is based in the American Western setting. The story follows racers in a transcontinental horse race, the "Steel Ball Run". Golden Kamuy (2014–2022) shifts its setting to the fallout of the Russo-Japanese War, specifically focusing on Hokkaido and Sakhalin, and featuring the Ainu people and other local tribes instead of Native Americans, as well other recognizable western tropes.

Comics
Western comics have included serious entries, (such as the classic comics of the late 1940s and early 1950s (namely Kid Colt, Outlaw, Rawhide Kid, and Red Ryder) or more modern ones as Blueberry), cartoons, and parodies (such as Cocco Bill and Lucky Luke). In the 1990s and 2000s, Western comics leaned towards the fantasy, horror and science fiction genres, usually involving supernatural monsters, or Christian iconography as in Preacher. More traditional Western comics are found throughout this period, though (e.g., Jonah Hex and Loveless).

Games
Western arcade games, computer games, role-playing games, and video games are often either straightforward Westerns or Western-horror hybrids.  Some Western-themed computer games include The Oregon Trail (1971), Mad Dog McCree (1990), Sunset Riders (1991), Outlaws (1997), Desperados series (2001–), Red Dead series (2004–), Gun (2005), and Call of Juarez series (2007–). Other video games adapt the "weird West" concept – e.g., Fallout (1997), Gunman Chronicles (2000), Darkwatch (2005), the Borderlands series (2009–), Fallout: New Vegas (2010), and  Hard West (2015).

Radio dramas
Western radio dramas were very popular from the 1930s to the 1960s.  Some popular shows include The Lone Ranger (first broadcast in 1933), The Cisco Kid (first broadcast in 1942), Dr. Sixgun (first broadcast in 1954), Have Gun–Will Travel (first broadcast in 1958), and Gunsmoke (first broadcast in 1952).

Web series
Westerns have been showcased in short-episodic web series. Examples include League of STEAM, Red Bird, and Arkansas Traveler.

Subgenres

Within the larger scope of the Western genre, there are several recognized subgenres. Some subgenres, such as spaghetti Westerns, maintain standard Western settings and plots, while others take the Western theme and archetypes into different supergenres, such as Neo-Westerns or Space Westerns.  For a time, Westerns made in countries other than the United States were often labeled by foods associated with the culture, such as spaghetti Westerns (Italy), meat pie Westerns (Australia), ramen Westerns (Asia), and masala Westerns (India).

Influence on other genres
Being period drama pieces, both the Western and samurai genre influenced each other in style and themes throughout the years. The Magnificent Seven was a remake of Akira Kurosawa's film Seven Samurai, and A Fistful of Dollars was a remake of Kurosawa's Yojimbo, which itself was inspired by Red Harvest, an American detective novel by Dashiell Hammett. Kurosawa was influenced by American Westerns and was a fan of the genre, most especially John Ford.

Despite the Cold War, the Western was a strong influence on Eastern Bloc cinema, which had its own take on the genre, the so-called "Red Western" or "Ostern". Generally  these took two forms: either straight Westerns shot in the Eastern Bloc, or action films involving the Russian Revolution and civil war and the Basmachi rebellion.

Many elements of space-travel series and films borrow extensively from the conventions of the Western genre. This is particularly the case in the space Western subgenre of science fiction. Peter Hyams' Outland transferred the plot of High Noon to Io, moon of Jupiter. More recently, the space opera series Firefly used an explicitly Western theme for its portrayal of frontier worlds. Anime shows such as Cowboy Bebop, Trigun and Outlaw Star have been similar mixes of science-fiction and Western elements. The science fiction Western can be seen as a subgenre of either Westerns or science fiction. Elements of Western films can be found also in some films belonging essentially to other genres. For example, Kelly's Heroes is a war film, but its action and characters are Western-like.

The character played by Humphrey Bogart in noir films such as Casablanca and To Have and Have Not—an individual bound only by his own private code of honor—has a lot in common with the classic Western hero. In turn, the Western has also explored noir elements, as with the films Pursued and Sugar Creek.

In many of Robert A. Heinlein's books, the settlement of other planets is depicted in ways explicitly modeled on American settlement of the West. For example, in his Tunnel in the Sky, settlers set out to the planet "New Canaan", via an interstellar teleporter portal across the galaxy, in Conestoga wagons, their captain sporting mustaches and a little goatee and riding a Palomino horse—with Heinlein explaining that the colonists would need to survive on their own for some years, so horses are more practical than machines.

Stephen King's The Dark Tower is a series of seven books that meshes themes of Westerns, high fantasy, science fiction, and horror. The protagonist Roland Deschain is a gunslinger whose image and personality are largely inspired by the Man with No Name from Sergio Leone's films. In addition, the superhero fantasy genre has been described as having been derived from the cowboy hero, only powered up to omnipotence in a primarily urban setting. The Western genre has been parodied on a number of occasions, famous examples being Support Your Local Sheriff!, Cat Ballou, Mel Brooks's Blazing Saddles, and Rustler's Rhapsody.

George Lucas's Star Wars films use many elements of a Western, and Lucas has said he intended for Star Wars to revitalize cinematic mythology, a part the Western once held. The Jedi, who take their name from Jidaigeki, are modeled after samurai, showing the influence of Kurosawa. The character Han Solo dressed like an archetypal gunslinger, and the Mos Eisley cantina is much like an Old West saloon.

Meanwhile, films such as The Big Lebowski, which plucked actor Sam Elliott out of the Old West and into a Los Angeles bowling alley, and Midnight Cowboy, about a Southern-boy-turned-gigolo in New York (who disappoints a client when he does not measure up to Gary Cooper), transplanted Western themes into modern settings for both purposes of parody and homage.

See also
 Dime Western
 Wild West shows
 List of Western computer and video games
 List of Western fiction authors
 Lists of Western films
 Western lifestyle

References

Further reading
 Buscombe, Edward, and Christopher Brookeman. The BFI Companion to the Western (A. Deutsch, 1988)
 Everson, William K. A Pictorial History of the Western Film (New York: Citadel Press, 1969)
 Kitses, Jim. Horizons West: The Western from John Ford to Clint Eastwood (British Film Institute, 2007).
 Lenihan, John H. Showdown: Confronting Modern America in the Western Film (University of Illinois Press, 1980)
 Nachbar, John G. Focus on the Western (Prentice Hall, 1974)
 Simmon, Scott. The Invention of the Western Film: A Cultural History of the Genre's First Half Century (Cambridge University Press, 2003)

External links

 Articles on Western film and TV in Western American Literature
 Special issue of Western American Literature on Global Westerns
 Most Popular Westerns at the Internet Movie Database
 Western Writers of America website
 "The Western", St. James Encyclopedia of Pop Culture, 2002
 I Watch Westerns, Ludwig von Mises Institute
 Film Festival for the Western Genre website
 Western Filmscript Collection. Yale Collection of Western Americana, Beinecke Rare Book and Manuscript Library.

 

Film genres
Fiction by genre
Genres
Works set in the 19th century
Articles containing video clips